Lynx (stylized as LYNX) is a bus system run by the Central Florida Regional Transportation Authority, serving the greater Orlando, Florida area in Orange, Seminole, and Osceola counties with limited service to Polk County. Bus routes are referred to as Links.

History

The Central Florida Regional Transportation Authority was formed in May 1972 under the name Orange-Seminole-Osceola Transportation Authority (OSOTA). The bus service was originally named Tri-County Transit, or TCT for short.  The authority changed its name in 1994 via a public naming contest and started doing business as Lynx.

The agency opened LYNX Central Station (LCS) in November 2004 and a new operations center called Lynx Operations Center (LOC) in 2007.

LYNX also opened through a partnership with the city of Kissimmee the Osceola Satellite Facility (OSF) to operate their Kissimmee routes Link 10, 18, 26, 55, 56, 57, 108, 306, 407, and 426. The only Kissimmee route that does not operate from OSF is FastLink 441 which is fully run out of LOC.

Services
Other LYNX services include a commuter assistance Vanpool program; Access LYNX paratransit service; NeighborLink (formerly PickUpLine) community circulators; and the Road Rangers roadside assistance program on Interstate 4 between Kissimmee and Daytona Beach, sponsored by State Farm.

Routes
LYNX operates a total of 84 bus routes in the Orlando area, serving Orange, Osceola, and Seminole counties with limited service to Polk County. LYNX routes include Link local bus routes, Disney Direct commuter service to Walt Disney World Resort, FastLink limited stop bus routes, the LYMMO zero-fare service in Downtown Orlando, and NeighborLink community circulator buses providing curb-to-curb service through advance reservations.

Bus stop signs were designed with a lynx paw in place of the traditional bus stop signs, which show a bus; although newer signs have been placed, adding the paw to the traditional sign.  Also, the route numbers are usually attached to the bus stop signs.

Fares
The standard adult one-way fare is $2 with free single transfers valid for 90 minutes (not valid on the same Link or for round trips).  LYNX runs the zero-fare LYMMO Bus in Downtown Orlando, connecting many downtown destinations to parking and the LYNX Central Station by controlling traffic signals on a three-mile route along a fully separate right-of-way or a combination of separate right-of-way and mixed traffic.  All LYNX buses, except the Lymmo, have bike racks (2 – 3 bike capacity) for use at no extra charge. A single transfer to another route is available for free, but must be used within 90 minutes of paying cash fare. A rolling 24-Hour Pass costs $4.50 and must be purchased on board the bus. Lynx offers a rolling 7-Day Pass for $16 and a rolling 30-Day pass for $50; these passes may be purchased at the Lynx Central Station, online, the app, and at various retailers in the Orlando area.

A Lynx Discount Fare ID allows for discounted fares for children ages 7 to 18, high school students, senior citizens over age 65, and persons with disabilities. The discount fare costs $1 for a single ride, $2.25 for a rolling 24-Hour Pass, $8 for a rolling 7-Day Pass, and $25 for a rolling 30-Day Pass.

Under 7 can board for free with fare-paying rider; 3-kid-limit applies.

Images

References

External links

 
 National Transit Database ridership profile for Lynx

Government agencies established in 1972
1972 establishments in Florida
Organizations based in Orlando, Florida
Bus transportation in Florida
Transportation in Orange County, Florida
Transportation in Osceola County, Florida
Transportation in Seminole County, Florida
Transportation in Orlando, Florida
Transit authorities with natural gas buses
Transit agencies in Florida
Zero-fare transport services